Northern Star Council is a Boy Scout Council headquartered in Saint Paul, Minnesota. The council was formerly the Viking Council and Indianhead Council until the two councils merged on July 1, 2005.  The council serves communities across central Minnesota and western Wisconsin, encompassing 25 counties.

History
The Viking Council was founded on October 15, 1910, as the Minneapolis Council. In 1952, the name was changed to Viking Council.  At the time of the merger with Indianhead Council, the geography of the Viking Council spanned from Minneapolis to the South Dakota border.  Other camps from the Viking Council included Stearns Scout Camp in Fair Haven Township, Minnesota and Rum River Scout Camp in Anoka, Minnesota. A history of patches used by the Viking Council and Minneapolis Council is available at the Viking Council Patch Archive.

The Indianhead Council was founded on October 1, 1910, as the St. Paul Council. In 1954, the name was changed to Indianhead Council.  The Indianhead Council was headquartered in Saint Paul, Minnesota, and included Ramsey and Washington Counties in Minnesota, and four counties Wisconsin.  Its name came from the shape of the Wisconsin-Minnesota border, which is said to resemble that of the head of an Indian.  Facilities included an office building in Saint Paul,  Tomahawk Scout Reservation near Rice Lake, Wisconsin, Phillipo Scout Reservation near Cannon Falls, Minnesota, Fred C. Andersen Scout Camp near Hudson, Wisconsin, and Kiwanis Scout Camp near Marine on St. Croix, Minnesota.

A flowchart of the history of these councils is depicted below:

Organization
Northern Star Council is divided into districts to better administer Scouting within geographic, specialty and cultural communities.

Geographic

Neighboring councils
The following councils neighbor Northern Star Council.

Camps

Northern Star Council is currently home to eight camps.

Tomahawk Scout Camp

Tomahawk Scout Camp is located near Rice Lake, Wisconsin. It sits on the shores of Long Lake, on which the camp owns several miles of shoreline.

Tomahawk is made up of four sub-camps:  Chippewa, Sioux, White Pine, and Arrow of Light.

History
Tomahawk began with Indianhead Council purchasing  of land on February 14, 1953, from businessman Aksel Nielsen.

Many Point Scout Camp

Many Point Scout Camp is a Boy Scout summer camp located along Many Point Lake on the White Earth Indian Reservation near the township of Ponsford in Becker County, Minnesota. Many Point is further divided into six sub-camps which serve troops, Venturing crews and families.

History
The first occupants of Many Point Lake and its surroundings were Native Americans of the Ojibwa tribe, who gave the lake its name for its many peninsulas. In the 19th century, the lake and woods which surrounded it were occupied by French fur traders and loggers, who harvested the abundant natural resources.

Many Point Scout Reservation was founded in 1946 by Wint Hartman, the first camping director for the reservation, and Boots Hanson, the first camp ranger. Wint's initial idea for the camp was that Scouts would come with their troops and be guided by principles such as leave no trace. This was a new idea for the BSA, as up until this time Scouts went to camp by themselves, and camps were much more para-military. Many Point Scout Camp was the first BSA camp to accommodate troops instead of just individual Scouts.

During the winter of 1946–1947, Boots Hanson lived alone on land purchased from the Many Point Gun and Rod club, what is today the Buckskin sub-camp. He spent the winter readying the land for Scouts. In the spring, when Wint Hartman drove up from the cities wondering if camp would be ready, he saw a red lantern hanging in Hanson's window, a sign that camp was ready. To this day, a red lantern is one of the symbols for Many Point. During the summer, lit red lanterns are hung outside of each sub-camp's lodge, as a sign that the camp is there for the Scouts. In the winter, red lanterns are placed in the windows of the rangers' homes.

As time went on and more land was obtained, new sub-camps were opened and additions were made to the camp. Today it is made up of a main administration area, three program camps for troop camping, a high adventure base, a camp with no staff or program for troops who wish to run their own program, as well as a camp for families.

Some of the staff have noted what seems to be a sunken bridge of some sort on part of the lake. They believe that over time, the lake began to fill with more water, causing this structure to collapse. They notice that the surrounding area is swampy, leading them to note that the loggers may have built a bridge over the swamp.

Geography
The camp is located on the White Earth Band of Ojibwe reservation, bordering the  Tamarac National Wildlife Refuge.

Main Area
The administration area is located a short drive into the camp, and is where troops check in at the start of their session. The area houses the administration building, which includes a lounge for staff, also used by counselors-in-training (CITs) on weekends. The Many Point History Center and fire tower are also located here. A few minutes away by foot is the camp maintenance shop and CIT base camp, also called CIT Hill.

Camps
Many Point is made up of four sub-camps, which are Buckskin, Ten Chiefs, Voyager and Pioneer. Many Point also has a family camp, where Scouting families may stay for the week. Preference is given to those families that have a Scout attending Many Point that same week. Family Camp includes a full program led by camp staff, 21 cabins, and 8 tenting sites. Many Point is also home to Flintlock, a high adventure base serving Scouts staying in Buckskin, Ten Chiefs, and Voyageur.

Buckskin

Buckskin is the oldest sub-camp within Many Point, and is a short walk from the administration area. Troops that camp in Buckskin stay in one of 13 troop sites, each containing multiple patrol sites. There is also a site called All Star, where Scouts, both boys and girls, may come independent from troops.

Buckskin is unique from the other camps for its dining hall, where Scouts and staff are fed, and therefore not required to cook their own food. The sub-camp is home to one of Many Point's three climbing towers and one of three  water trampolines.

Ten Chiefs

Much like Buckskin, troops stay in one of 13 troop sites, but unlike Buckskin must do their own cooking, except for dinner, which is delivered from the commissary. The second of the three climbing towers and water trampolines are located within Ten Chiefs.

Voyageur

Voyageur has 13 campsites, and like Ten Chiefs troops must cook their own meals. The third climbing tower, as well as the third water trampoline, are both located within Voyageur.

Flintlock

Flintlock is unique from each of the other sub-camps as, instead of being composed of troop sites and activity areas, it serves as Many Point's high adventure base. Flintlock and parts of southern Ten Chiefs are located in the camp's fabled Yeti Swamp which claims to be the home of the camp's legendary yeti.

Flintlock's activities are divided into three different tiers of adventure.

Tier One comprises activities where older Scouts (8th grade and above) from each sub-camp may sign up for a day activity or overnight trip to one of the camp's two Project COPE courses, the tree houses, or Huck Finn Rafts and also participate in International Target Sports Outpost and Adventure Cove.

Tier Two comprises trek style activities where older Scouts (9th grade and above) are able to participate in adventures outside of Many Point or higher adventure activities.  They offer an  kayak trek down the Otter Tail River, two mountain bike treks at the Maplelag Resort and Itasca State Park, a multi-modal trek through the Beaver Lake chain nearby, and most recently an all-terrain vehicle day ride.

Tier Three is reserved for specialty week long programs offered through Flintlock High Adventure Base.  Two programs are offered every week of camp, and others are offered on a specialty one or two week opportunity throughout the summer.  Water Sports Outpost and Older Scout Adventure Blast are offered each week, where Water Sports Outpost allows older Scouts to ride personal watercraft and water ski or wake-board and Older Scout Adventure Blast offers all-terrain vehicle riding and mornings of Tier One Activities.  The specialty programs are titled All-Things weeks and offer a full week of SCUBA, Aquatics, Wilderness Response, or Sportsman activities.

Also at Flintlock is the new Frontier program. Located across the bay from Buckskin and only accessible by boat, Flintlock staff and interested troops are helping to build a replica of an 1860s logging camp, the Thompson-Peake Lumber Company, that used to be on Many Point Lake.

Pioneer

Pioneer is located along the southwest shore of Many Point Lake, between Voyageur and Family Camp. Unfortunately, the sub-camp is no longer in use. However, troops and crews may come to this camp if they wish to make and run their own program with minimal staff interaction.

Family Camp

Family Camp is built on the site of a former resort, on a peninsula that stretches to the center of Many Point Lake. While priority for the cabins and tent sites is given to families of Scouts and Scoutmasters camping at another sub-camp, any family can come and spend a week doing some fun camp activities or relaxing for the entire week. Swimming lessons, arts and crafts, and trips to Itasca State Park are also available. Many Point Family Camp is unique from other BSA family camps as it is one of the only in the nation to run a program for families.

Former camps

In the early days of Scouting, councils did not own properties permanently set aside for camping.  Scouts simply met at undeveloped land and set up a temporary camp.  However, the need for larger, permanent spaces was recognized.

Oak Point (Square Lake)
The first property purchased by the then-St. Paul Council was on Oak Point of Square Lake near Stillwater, MN.  Established in 1918, it was officially named "Oak Point Camp" but known as "Square Lake Camp" by the campers.  It served the council for many years, but became too small for the demand in the 1930s, and was closed in 1937 when it was severely damaged by a storm.

Neibel

Looking for a larger property, the council purchased  of land on the eastern shore of Balsam Lake, Wisconsin, which was opened as Camp Neibel in the mid-1930s.  It was named after Frank Neibel, who was the Scout Executive of the council at the time, and included a small island which was used for camping trips.  Eventually, it too was outgrown, and it was closed in 1954, shortly after the land for Camp Tomahawk was purchased.  The former Camp Neibel property was subdivided into individual lots, but the original pillars and entrance gate can be seen on the road that still bears the name "Neibel Lane".

Order of the Arrow
The council is served by the Totanhan Nakaha Lodge, which was formed in 2006 after the Viking and Indianhead Councils merged. Its name means "From the Past, A New Beginning". The previous lodges and their origins are depicted below.

See also
 Scouting in Minnesota

References

External links
 Northern Star Council Home Page
 Camping Information
 Council Districts
 Many Point Scout Camp Homepage
 Tomahawk Scout Reservation
 MPSAA (Many Point Staff Alumni Association)
 SSAA (Stearns Staff Alumni Association)
 TSAA (Tomahawk Staff Alumni Association)
 Viking Council Patch Archive

Local councils of the Boy Scouts of America
Central Region (Boy Scouts of America)
Youth organizations based in Minnesota
2005 establishments in Minnesota